The 2006 Major League Lacrosse season was the sixth season of the league.  The season began on May 20 and concluded with the championship game on August 27, 2006.

General information
The season marked the first expansion teams in the MLL. Chicago Machine, Denver Outlaws, Los Angeles Riptide and San Francisco Dragons made up the new Western Conference. The original six teams formed the Eastern Conference.

New Jersey moved its home games to Yurcak Field and Rochester moved its home games to PAETEC Park.

On April 21, MLL announced a trade involving six teams and 24 players and draft picks. MLL believes it to be the largest trade in sports history.

The June 29 game between Boston at Philadelphia was called with 13:00 remaining in the fourth quarter due to a lightning storm. Boston won the game 16-5.

The Chicago Machine became the first MLL team to go a whole season without a victory after losing in overtime to San Francisco on August 12.

Regular season
W = Wins, L = Losses, PTS = Points, PCT = Winning Percentage, GF = Goals For, 2ptGF = 2 point Goals For, GA = Goals Against, 2ptGA = 2 point Goals Against

New Jersey finished 3rd in the East based on overall conference record (5-5) versus (4-6) for both Long Island and Rochester. Long Island finished 4th based on total points scored margin in games against Rochester (+10).

All Star Game

July 6, 2006

Team USA 18-10 MLL All Stars at Nickerson Field Boston, Massachusetts Kevin Cassese of Team USA MVP

Playoffs

Semi-finals
August 25 @ Home Depot Center, Carson, California
Denver 23-14 San Francisco
Philadelphia 17-12 Boston

Championship 
August 27 @ Home Depot Center, Carson, California
Philadelphia 23-12 Denver

Bracket

Awards

6
Major League Lacrosse